The men's K-1 slalom competition in canoeing at the 2008 Summer Olympics took place between August 11 and 12 2008 at the Shunyi Olympic Rowing-Canoeing Park in Beijing. The K-1 (single kayak) event was raced by one-man kayaks through a whitewater course.

There were three rounds of competitions: the heats, the semifinal, and the final. In the heats, each canoeist completed two runs of the course. The time, in seconds, of each run was added to the number of penalty points assessed. Touching any of the 21 slalom gates resulted in a 2-second penalty for each gate touched, while skipping any of the gates resulted in a 50-second penalty. The total times for the two preliminary runs were summed to give a score for the heats. The top 15 boats advanced to the semifinals.

The semifinals consisted of a single run. The field was narrowed to the top 10 scores from that run; those 10 boats advanced to the final. The times from the final were added to the semifinal score to give an overall total.

Schedule
All times are China Standard Time (UTC+8)

Medalists

Results

Heats

 Qualified for semifinals

Semifinal

 Qualified for final

Final

References

ICF slalom canoeing schedule for the 2008 Summer Olympics. - accessed July 30, 2008.
Sports-reference.com 2008 men's K-1 slalom results.

Men's Slalom K-1
Men's events at the 2008 Summer Olympics